Capitán Luis Ángel Vidal is a municipality in the Mexican state of Chiapas, located approximately  southeast of the state capital of Tuxtla Gutiérrez. Its inhabitants are of Guatemalan origin and speak the Mam language.

Geography
The municipality of Capitán Luis Ángel Vidal is located in the Sierra Madre de Chiapas in the southern part of the state. It borders the municipalities of Ángel Albino Corzo to the north, Honduras de la Sierra to the east, Escuintla to the southeast, Acacoyagua to the south, Mapastepec to the west, and Montecristo de Guerrero to the northwest.

The western part of the municipality lies in El Triunfo Biosphere Reserve, while the eastern part lies in the Pico El Loro-Paxtal Ecological Conservation Area.

The climate is generally temperate.

History
The community of Capitán Luis Ángel Vidal was founded in 1954 and was originally part of the municipality of Siltepec. On 18 August 2017, the Congress of Chiapas approved the separation of Capitán Luis Ángel Vidal and its surrounding communities from Siltepec to create a new municipality. The decree establishing Capitán Luis Ángel Vidal and Rincón Chamula San Pedro as new municipalities was gazetted on 6 September 2017.

Administration
In 2018, Capitán Luis Ángel Vidal elected its first municipal president, Emiselda González Roblero.

Demographics
In the 2010 Mexican Census, the localities that now comprise the municipality of Capitán Luis Ángel Vidal recorded a total population of 3653 inhabitants.

There are 49 localities in the municipality, of which only the municipal seat, also named Capitán Luis Ángel Vidal, is designated as urban. It recorded a population of 563 inhabitants in the 2010 Census.

Economy
Coffee production is the predominant economic activity in Capitán Luis Ángel Vidal. Dairy cattle are also raised.

References

Municipalities of Chiapas
2017 establishments in Mexico
States and territories established in 2017